Irinel Constantin Voicu (born 9 May 1977) is a former Romanian footballer and currently a manager.

Honours

Player
Oțelul Târgoviște
Divizia B: 1995–96

Rocar București
Cupa României: runner-up 2000–01

AEK București
Divizia B: 2001–02

External links
 
 

1977 births
Living people
Sportspeople from Târgoviște
Romanian footballers
FC Dinamo București players
AFC Rocar București players
FC Politehnica Timișoara players
FC Vaslui players
FC Unirea Urziceni players
CS Mioveni players
FC Voluntari players
AS Voința Snagov players
Liga I players
Association football defenders